QMAP was a balloon experiment to measure the anisotropy of the cosmic microwave background (CMB). It flew twice in 1996, and was used with an interlocking scan of the skies to produce CMB maps at angular scales between 0.7° and 9°.

The gondola was later used for ground-based observations as the MAT/TOCO experiment; so named because the instrument was called the Mobile Anisotropy Telescope and it was positioned at Cerro Toco in the Chilean Andes. It was the first such experiment to localize the position of the first acoustical peak in the CMB.

See also
Cosmic microwave background experiments
Observational cosmology

References

Physics experiments
Cosmic microwave background experiments
Balloon-borne telescopes